James Montgomery (born on May 12, 1949) is an American blues musician, best known as the lead singer, blues harp player, frontman, and bandleader of The James Montgomery Blues Band (a.k.a. The James Montgomery Band). Montgomery collaborates with many star performers and recording artists. He is also the past President of The New England Blues Society.

Personal life 
James Montgomery was born on May 12, 1949, in Detroit, Michigan. He grew up in Detroit where his father, John Montgomery, worked for Chrysler as a public relations executive. One of his brothers, John Montgomery, also worked in the music industry before becoming an entrepreneur in the Metro Detroit area. His younger brother, Jeffrey Montgomery, was an LGBT activist primarily known for being the founding executive director of Triangle Foundation (today Equality Michigan).

Music career 
"While attending Boston University, where he earned a degree in English literature, Mr. Montgomery started the James Montgomery Band. His freshman roommate was Jeff Baxter. During his junior year, he was hired by the Colwell-Winfield Blues Band to play harmonica and tour with Janis Joplin. By the time he graduated from college his band was on the cover of the Boston Phoenix, heralded along with J. Geils and Aerosmith as the city's great contributions to the music world. Though he said he loved the academic life when offered a $15,000 job at BU, Mr. Montgomery took a $250,000 offer to record records and tour with the Allman Brothers instead, and never looked back." by Pamela Marean, Standard-Times correspondent, September 6, 2007

In 1970 Montgomery formed The James Montgomery Band. His harmonica playing, singing and energetic stage show led to his band gaining a reputation as one of the hottest bands on the New England music scene. James Montgomery was signed by Capricorn Records to a multi-album deal and released his first vinyl LP album titled The James Montgomery Band – First Time Out in 1973.  The original LP recordings were remastered and released as a CD in October 20, 1998 by Capricorn / Umgd.  Track 9 off his first album titled "Train" was a fan favorite and became the Number 1 song on WBCN, The Rock of Boston. They played it every day at noon-time for over a year.  In 2011, Montgomery brought "Train" back as a surprise encore at shows.

Montgomery has toured with many artists, including Aerosmith, The J. Geils Band, Bonnie Raitt, Bruce Springsteen, The Allman Brothers, The Steve Miller Band, The Johnny Winter Band, The Blues Brothers with (Jim Belushi and Dan Aykroyd) and others.

James Montgomery has performed on stage with a long list of musicians including B.B. King, Muddy Waters, Buddy Guy, John Lee Hooker, Junior Wells, James Cotton, Bonnie Raitt, Steven Tyler (Aerosmith Frontman and American Idol TV Show Judge), Brad Whitford (Aerosmith guitarist), Charlie Daniels, Gregg Allman, LaVern Baker, Patti LaBelle, Jonathan Edwards, Jerome Geils (The J. Geils Band), Peter Wolf (The J. Geils Band), Magic Dick (The J. Geils Band), Danny Klein (The J. Geils Band), Huey Lewis (Huey Lewis and the News), Kim Wilson (The Fabulous Thunderbirds), Elliot Easton (The Cars), Rick Derringer, Ricky Byrd  (formerly with Joan Jett and the Black Hearts), Barry Goudreau (former guitarist for Boston), Fran Sheehan (former bassist for Boston), Sib Hashian (former drummer for Boston), Chad Smith (The Red Hot Chili Peppers), Billy Squier, Michael Carabello (percussionist in Santana), Jon Butcher (Johanna Wild, The Jon Butcher Axis and today Farren Butcher Inc), Bruce Marshall (lead singer/guitarist for The Toy Caldwell Band and The Bruce Marshall Group), Dennis "Fly" Amero (Orleans), Duke Robillard, Jon Pousette-Dart (The Pousette-Dart Band), Jonathan Edwards, Kate Taylor, Christine Ohlman "The Beehive Queen", Mike Finnigan, Grace Kelly, The Uptown Horns, the famous Manhattan, New York-based horn section for B.B. King, James Brown, The Rolling Stones, Joe Cocker, The J. Geils Band and more).  The Uptown Horns is composed of Larry Etkin (trumpet), Crispin Cioe(sax), Arno Hecht (sax), and Bob Funk (trombone).  Their signature horn riffs can be heard on American chart busting songs including Grammy-award winning James Brown, the Godfather of Soul's "Living in America", The B-52's Love Shack LP, Buster Poindexter's (a.k.a. David Johansen) "Hot Hot Hot", Joe Cocker's Unchain My Heart LP, Tom Waits' Rain Dogs LP, and Billy Joel's River of Dreams LP, and the upcoming LP by James Montgomery titled From Detroit to the Delta.

Montgomery recalls the night he played with Muddy Waters at Paul's Mall in Boston, Massachusetts.  "I couldn't believe it. Here I was on stage with Muddy Waters," Montgomery recalls with a smile. "It was such a great feeling.".

James had his own syndicated radio show for five years called "Backstage With the Blues" on these stations:
 WJZS Swing 99.3 FM Block Island, Rhode Island
 WADK 1540 AM Newport, Rhode Island and Fall River, Massachusetts
 WFNX 92.1 FM Portland, Maine and Portsmouth, New Hampshire
 KUSH 1600, Cushing, Oklahoma

The show combined great Blues songs along with the stories behind the music, told by the musicians themselves, it provided a bridge between the listeners and the artists as they reminisced about the history of their music. Some of his special guests were John Lee Hooker, James Cotton, Dr. John, Bonnie Raitt, Koko Taylor, Ruth Brown, Otis Clay, Son Seals, Duke Robillard, Rod Piazza, and many more.

James Montgomery Blues Band (a.k.a. James Montgomery Band) 
During the past 45 years Montgomery's band has been a springboard for many musicians careers. His band members have included Billy Squier, Wayne Kramer (MC-5), Jeff Golub (Rod Stewart), Jim McCarty (Mitch Ryder and the Detroit Wheels), Nunzio Signore (Bo Diddley), Steve Strout Nashville sideman Jeff Pevar (Ray Charles, Crosby, Stills & Nash), Bobby Chouinard (drummer with Alice Cooper, Ted Nugent, Billy Squier and Robert Gordon), Jeff Levine (Joe Cocker), Tom Gambel (Aerosmith), David Hull (substitute bassist for Aerosmith on their 2006, 2008 and 2014 tours, David Hull was the bassist for The Joe Perry Project, the band Farrenheit (with Charlie Farren and John "Muzz" Muzzy) and The Buddy Miles Band.  In 2010 while still a member of Montgomery's band, David Hull released his first CD called Soul in Motion (David was the singer, songwriter, guitarist, bassist and producer of his own album). Plus many, many, more exceptional musicians have been members of Montgomery's band.

Discography

References

External links 
 
 Profile at MySpace
 Profile at ReverbNation
 jm blues at Twitter
 James Montgomery Discography at The Reel Blues Fest
 James Montgomery at AllMusic

1949 births
Living people
Singers from Michigan
Harmonica blues musicians
American blues singers
American blues harmonica players
American male singers